Chérif or Cherif may refer to:

People

Surname
Ahmed Bey ben Mohamed Chérif (1784–1850), last Bey of Constantine, Algeria, ruling from 1826 to 1848
Cipriano Rivas Cherif (1891–1967), Spanish playwright and director, owner of the Caracol Theatre Club
Fatima Zohra Cherif (born 1986), Algerian volleyball player
Ilès Ziane Cherif (born 1984), Algerian football player
Mahmoud Cherif (1912–1987), Algerian military leader and politician
Moulay Ali Cherif (died 1659), allegedly a descendant of l-Hesn d-Dakhl, considered to have been the founder of the Alaouite Dynasty of Morocco
Sid Ali Yahia-Chérif (born 1985), Algerian football player
Wafa Cherif (born 1986), Tunisian handball goalkeeper
Walid Cherif (born 1978), Tunisian boxer

Given name
Abdennour Chérif El-Ouazzani (born 1986), Algerian football player
Chérif Abdeslam (born 1978), Algerian football player
M. Cherif Bassiouni (1937–2017), Muslim international United Nations war crimes expert
Cherif Guellal (1932–2009), Algerian businessman and diplomat who fought in the Algerian independence movement
Cherif Mohamed Aly Aidara (born 1959), Senegalese-Mauritanian Shi'i religious leader
Chérif Oudjani (born 1964), former football player
Chérif Ousmane Sarr (born 1986), midfielder
Chérif Souleymane (born 1944), former Guinean footballer
Chérif Touré Mamam (born 1978), Togolese footballer
Mohand Chérif Hannachi (born 1950), former Algerian football player and current chairman of Algerian club JS Kabylie
Tahar Chérif El-Ouazzani (born 1967), Algerian footballer and coach

Other uses
Sherif
Zawiyet Sidi Amar Cherif, zawiya in Boumerdès Province, Algeria
Aïn Sidi Chérif, town and commune in Mostaganem Province, Algeria
Cherif (TV series), a French police series which first aired in 2013
Cherif Al Idrissi Airport (IATA: AHU, ICAO: GMTA),  an airport serving Al Hoceima, Morocco, the capital city of the Taza-Al Hoceima-Taounate region in northern Morocco
Miss Webster and Chérif, a novel by Patricia Duncker first published in 2006
Moulay Ali Cherif Airport (IATA: ERH, ICAO: GMFK), an airport serving Errachidia (Er-Rachidia), a town in the Meknès-Tafilalet region in Morocco
Chérif Chekatt, the perpetrator of the 2018 Strasbourg attack